In the British peerage, a royal duke is a member of the British royal family, entitled to the titular dignity of prince and the style of His Royal Highness, who holds a dukedom. Dukedoms are the highest titles in the British roll of peerage, and the holders of these particular dukedoms are princes of the blood royal. The holders of the dukedoms are royal, not the titles themselves. They are titles created and bestowed on legitimate sons and male-line grandsons of the British monarch, usually upon reaching their majority or marriage. The titles can be inherited but cease to be called "royal" once they pass beyond the grandsons of a monarch. As with any peerage, once the title becomes extinct, it may subsequently be recreated by the reigning monarch at any time.

Royal status of dukedoms
In the United Kingdom, there is nothing intrinsic to any dukedom that makes it "royal". Rather, these peerages are called royal dukedoms because they are created for, and held by, members of the royal family who are entitled to the titular dignity of prince and the style Royal Highness. Although the term "royal duke" therefore has no official meaning per se, the category "Duke of the Blood Royal" was acknowledged as a rank conferring special precedence at court in the unrevoked 20th clause of the Lord Chamberlain's order of 1520. This decree accorded precedence to any peer related by blood to the sovereign above all others of the same degree within the peerage. The order did not apply within Parliament, nor did it grant precedence above the archbishop of Canterbury or other Great Officers of State such as is now enjoyed by royal dukes. But it placed junior "Dukes of the Blood Royal" above the most senior non-royal duke, junior "Earls of the Blood Royal" above the most senior non-royal earl (cf. Earldom of Wessex), etc. It did not matter how distantly related to the monarch the peers might be (presumably they ranked among each other in order of succession to the Crown). Although the 1520 order is theoretically still in effect, in fact the "Blood Royal" clause seems to have fallen into desuetude by 1917 when King George V limited the style of Royal Highness to children and male-line grandchildren of the sovereign. Thus peers of the blood royal who are neither sons nor grandsons of a sovereign are no longer accorded precedence above other peers.

Assuming that Alexander Windsor, Earl of Ulster and George Windsor, Earl of St Andrews succeed their fathers to become the third Duke of Gloucester and the third Duke of Kent respectively, their peerages (as created in 1928 and 1934) will cease to be royal dukedoms; instead their holders will become "ordinary" dukes. The third dukes of Gloucester and Kent will each be styled His Grace because, as great-grandsons of King George V, they are not princes and are not styled HRH. Similarly, upon the death of Prince Arthur, Duke of Connaught and Strathearn (1850–1942) (the third son of Queen Victoria), his only male-line grandson, Alastair, Earl of MacDuff (1914–43), briefly succeeded to his peerages and was styled His Grace. Before the 1917 changes, his style had been His Highness Prince Alastair of Connaught.

Current royal dukedoms
The current royal dukedoms, held as principal titles, in order of precedence, are:

The following dukedoms are currently held by William, Prince of Wales:
Duke of Cornwall is a title automatically held by the Sovereign's eldest son in England. In addition to the dukedom of Cornwall, a peerage, the holder also enjoys a life interest in the Duchy of Cornwall. 
Duke of Rothesay is a title automatically held by the Sovereign's heir apparent in Scotland, who is properly called "HRH The Prince William, Duke of Rothesay" (rather than "HRH The Prince of Wales") in Scotland.
Duke of Cambridge is a title which was conferred on the Prince on his wedding day, 29 April 2011.

With the exceptions of the dukedoms of Cornwall and Rothesay (which can only be held by the eldest living son of the sovereign who is also the heir apparent), these dukedoms are hereditary according to the letters patent that created them. Those patents contain the standard remainder to "heirs male of his body", with the exception of the Dukedom of Edinburgh, which is a life peerage and will become extinct on the death of the current Duke.

By law the British monarch also holds, and is entitled to the revenues of, the Duchy of Lancaster. Within the borders of the County Palatine of Lancashire, therefore, the monarch is hailed as "The King/Queen, The Duke of Lancaster" (even when the monarch is a queen regnant, by tradition she does not use the title Duchess). However, legally the monarch is not the Duke of Lancaster: peerages are in origin held feudally of the sovereign who, as the fount of honour, cannot hold a peerage of him- or herself. The situation is similar in the Channel Islands, where the monarch is addressed as Duke of Normandy, but only in accordance with tradition. He or she does not hold the legal title of Duke of Normandy.

Former royal dukedoms
The following is a list of dukedoms previously created for members of the royal family, but which have subsequently merged in the crown, become extinct or have otherwise ceased to be royal dukedoms.

Extinct dukedoms

Extinct as royal dukedoms

Suspended dukedoms

Under the Titles Deprivation Act 1917 the holders of the following dukedoms, who were simultaneously British princes and members of royal and princely families of Germany, were deprived of their British titles, having sided with Germany during the First World War. The Act provides that a successor of a person thus deprived of a peerage can petition the Crown for revival of the title. No such descendant has done so.

Royal dukedoms created since 1726

Forms of address
Address: His/Her Royal Highness The Duke/Duchess of (X)
Speak to as: Your Royal Highness
After: Sir/Madam

Coronet
While non-royal dukes are entitled to a coronet of eight strawberry leaves, to bear at a coronation and on his coat of arms, royal dukes are entitled to princely coronets (four cross pattées alternating with four strawberry leaves). The coronets of the royal family are dictated by letters patent. The Dukes of Sussex, of York and of Edinburgh bear by letters patent the coronet of a child of the sovereign (four crosses patées alternating with four fleurs-de-lis), while the Duke of Cornwall, Rothesay and Cambridge has use of the Prince of Wales' coronet, and the current dukes of Gloucester and of Kent, as grandsons of a sovereign bear the corresponding coronet of a royal duke.

At coronations, apart from the differentiation of princely coronets from ducal coronets, a royal duke is also entitled to six rows of ermine spots on his mantle, as opposed to the four rows borne by an "ordinary" duke.

See also
Substantive title
Dukes in the United Kingdom
List of dukedoms in the peerages of Britain and Ireland
List of dukes in the peerages of Britain and Ireland
Duchies in England
List of peerages created for British princes
Princess Royal

Notes

References

Royal
Peerages in the United Kingdom